The Nadoja Award is a prestigious award presented annually by Kannada University, Hampi, India to eminent personalities for their contribution in various fields. The word "Nadoja" belongs to Adikavi Pampa which means `teacher to the Land's.

Recipients

The recipients of Nadoja Award are:

References

External links
Kannada University Website

Indian awards